In linguistics, language classification is the grouping of related languages into the same category. There are two main kinds of language classification: genealogical and typological classification.

Genealogical (or genetic) classification
Languages are grouped by diachronic relatedness into language families. In other words, languages are grouped based on how they were developed and evolved throughout history, with languages which descended from a common ancestor being grouped into the same language family.

Typological classification

Languages are grouped by their structural and functional features.

See also 
 Genetic relationship
 List of language families

References 

Language
Linguistics